Atharga  is a village in the southern state of Karnataka, India. It is located in the Indi taluk of Bijapur district in Karnataka.

Demographics
 India census, Atharga had a population of 8610 with 4430 males and 4180 females. The current MP of Bijapur lokasabha Mr.  Ramesh Jigajinagi is from this village.

Sri Kulankareshwara Temple is in the west part of the village.

Transport
Atharga is connected only by Road(SH34). There are many buses from Bijapur and Indi. The nearest railway station is Minchanal which is about 8 km from the village

Exactly 25 km from Bijapur and Indi.

Education
 BLDEA's Horticulture Training Institute
 BLDEA's Shri R M Biradar High school and P U College
 Banjara High School
 Govt Kannada Boys Primary School
 Govt Kannada Girls Primary School
 Govt Urdu Primary School

There are many convent schools there, too.

Economy
Farming and agriculture related business is the main occupation for many people in the village. The cropping pattern in the village reveals that food crops like jowar, maize, bajra and wheat among cereals, red gram, Bengal gram and green gram among pulses are major crops cultivated in the village. The major oilseed crops are sunflower, groundnut and safflower. Horticulture crops like grapes, pomegranate, ber, guava sapota, and lime are also grown. Atharga is famous for lime.

See also

 Indi
 Bijapur
 Districts of Karnataka

References

External links
 http://Bijapur.nic.in/

Villages in Bijapur district, Karnataka